Prays lobata is a moth of the family Plutellidae. It is found in Hubei, China.

References
 , 2011, A taxonomic review of Prays Hübner, 1825 (Lepidoptera: Yponomeutoidea: Praydidae) China with descriptions of two new species. Tijdschrift voor Entomologie 154 (1): 25-32.

Plutellidae
Moths described in 2004